WKDW-LP is a Variety formatted broadcast radio station licensed to North Port, Florida, serving North Port and Warm Mineral Springs in Florida.  WKDW-LP is owned and operated by Community Broadband Radio Association, Inc.

References

External links
 WKDW 97-5FM Online
 

2016 establishments in Florida
Variety radio stations in the United States
Radio stations established in 2016
KDW-LP
KDW-LP